Terry Boyes (1936-2017), was a male swimmer who competed for England.

Swimming career
He represented England in the 440 yards freestyle at the 1958 British Empire and Commonwealth Games in Cardiff, Wales.

He was a member of the York City Baths Club and an engraver by trade.

References

1936 births
2017 deaths
English male swimmers
Swimmers at the 1958 British Empire and Commonwealth Games
Commonwealth Games competitors for England